Spring Song is a 1946 British drama film directed by Montgomery Tully and starring Peter Graves, Carol Raye and Lawrence O'Madden. The film follows the history of a brooch after it is given as a present by a man to a woman in 1911.

Cast
 Peter Graves - Tony Winster
 Carol Raye - Janet Hill/Janet Ware
 Lawrence O'Madden - Johnnie Ware
 Leni Lynn - Vera Dale
 Netta Westcott - Lady Norchester
 Diana Calderwood - Mary Norchester
 David Horne - Sir Anthony
 Finlay Currie - Cobb
 Alan Wheatley - Menelli
 Peter Penn - Carrington
 Maire O'Neill - Dresser
 Gerhard Kempinski - Hotel Manager
 Lois Maxwell - Penelope Cobb 
 Jack Billings - Dancer

References

External links

1946 films
1946 drama films
Films directed by Montgomery Tully
British drama films
British black-and-white films
Films shot at British National Studios
1940s English-language films
1940s British films